Rovere may refer to 

 Italian noble House of Della Rovere or any of its members
 Italian name of Sessile Oak
 Roveré Veronese, an Italian municipality
 Roveré della Luna, an Italian municipality
 Rovere, Rocca di Mezzo, a frazione of Rocca di Mezzo, Province of L'Aquila, Abruzzo, Italy
 Lucrezia Lante della Rovere (born 1966), Italian actress
 Richard Rovere (1915–1979), American journalist
 Gino Rovere (fl. 1934–1938, Italian racing driver

See also 
 Rover (disambiguation)